Ann Township is a township of Kyaukpyu District in the Rakhine State of Myanmar. The principal town is Ann. Founded in 1333 AD in King Min Hti.

"Ann Creek" Hydropower Project is being implemented by the Ministry of Electric Power No. 1 on Ann Creek, 3.5 miles northeast to Ann. The project can generate 44 million kilowatt hours yearly when it is finished.

Hla Maung Tin, an elected Rakhine State Hluttaw Member of Ann Township representing Union Solidarity and Development Party in 2010 election, served as the 1st Rakhine State Chief Minister from 2011 to June 2014.

References

External links
 "Ann Township - Rakhine State" map ID: MIMU154v01, creation date: 16 August 2010, Myanmar Information Management Unit (MIMU)
 "An Google Satellite Map" Maplandia World Gazetteer

 
Townships of Rakhine State